Jennifer French may refer to:

Jennifer French (politician), Canadian politician
Jennifer French (sailor) (born 1971), American Paralympic sailor